The Frühjahrs Dreijährigen-Preis is a Group 3 flat horse race in Germany open to three-year-old thoroughbreds. It is run over a distance of 2,000 metres (about 1¼ miles) at Frankfurt in late April or early May.

History
The event was established in 1965, and it was originally called the Adolf Schindling-Rennen. It was named in memory of Adolf Schindling (1887–1963), a Frankfurt-born businessman who owned the successful stud farm Gestüt Asta.

The race was given Group 3 status in 1982. For a period it was sponsored by Steigenberger Hotels and run as the Preis der Steigenberger Hotels. It was later backed by BMW and titled the BMW Händler-Trophy.

The banking company Bankhaus Metzler took over the sponsorship in 2000. Since 2016 it was moved to Baden-Baden to be run at its spring festival and renamed the Ittlingen Derby Trial.

Records
Leading jockey (7 wins):
 Eduardo Pedroza – Shrek (2007), Scalo (2010), Earl of Tinsdal (2011), Novellist (2012), Wai Key Star (2016), Langtang (2017), Royal Youmzain (2018)

Leading trainer (11 wins):
 Heinz Jentzsch – Bussard (1967), Sayonara (1968), Don Giovanni (1969), Samun (1970), Muffel (1971), Lua Vindu (1978), Ataxerxes (1980), Abary (1983), Lontano (1985), Monsun (1993), Savinelli (1994)

Winners

 Aboard finished first in 1998, but he was relegated to second place following a stewards' inquiry.

 Since 2016 it is disputed in late May or early June at Baden-Baden and named the Ittlingen Derby-Trial.

See also
 List of German flat horse races
 Recurring sporting events established in 1965 – this race is included under its original title, Adolf Schindling-Rennen.

References
 Racing Post / siegerlisten.com:
 1983, 1984, 1985, 1986, 1987, 1988, 1989, 
 galopp-sieger.de – Frühjahrspreis des Bankhaus Metzler.
 horseracingintfed.com – International Federation of Horseracing Authorities – Race Detail (2012).
 pedigreequery.com – Frühjahrs Dreijährigen-Preis – Frankfurt.

Flat horse races for three-year-olds
Sports competitions in Frankfurt
Horse races in Germany